Morbio may refer to:

Morbio Inferiore, a village in Switzerland
Morbio Superiore, a village in Switzerland